Kukigatani-ike Dam  is an earthfill dam located in Kyoto Prefecture in Japan. The dam is used for flood control and irrigation. The dam impounds about 1  ha of land when full and can store 20 thousand cubic meters of water. The construction of the dam was completed in 1949.

See also
List of dams in Japan

References

Dams in Kyoto Prefecture